Amanda Foreman may refer to:

Amanda Foreman (actress) (born 1966), American actress
Amanda Foreman (historian) (born 1968), British/American biographer and historian